Agalinis purpurea (known by common names including purple false foxglove and purple gerardia) is an annual forb native to the eastern United States and Canada, which produces purple flowers in late summer or early fall.

Description

Agalinis purpurea is 10 to 120 centimeters tall. The stem is slender, with spreading branches. It has simple opposite leaves, which are 10 to 40 millimeters long, and only 0.5 to 2 millimeters wide. The flowers are racemose on the branches. They are borne on 1 to 8 millimeter long pedicles. Each flower is bilaterally symmetrical, with five 20 to 38 millimeter long petals fused into a corolla tube, and four stamens. The fruit is a round 4 to 6 millimeter long dry capsule that splits open when ripe.

Distribution and habitat
Agalinis purpurea is widely distributed in the eastern United States, although local distribution may be spotty. It has been recorded in Alabama, Arkansas, Connecticut, Washington, D.C., Delaware, Florida, Georgia, Iowa, Illinois, Indiana, Kansas, Kentucky, Louisiana, Massachusetts, Maryland, Michigan, Minnesota, Missouri, Mississippi, North Carolina, Nebraska, New Hampshire, New Jersey, New York, Ohio, Pennsylvania, Rhode Island, South Carolina, Tennessee, Texas, Virginia, Wisconsin, and West Virginia. It has also been recorded in the Canadian province of Ontario. In Virginia, it grows in habitats such as marshes, swamps, interdune swales, and old fields. The presence of this species is dependent on appropriate habitat, and it may be eliminated from an area by development, changes in land use, or competition with invasive species.

Ecology
Like other members of the genus Agalinis, this species is hemiparasitic on a variety of hosts, particularly graminoids. Agalinis purpurea uses haustoria to connect its roots with those of its host plants, but it also has green tissues, and performs photosynthesis.

Taxonomy
This species is a member of the genus Agalinis, which was formerly placed in the family Scrophulariaceae, but has more recently been placed in the family Orobanchaceae, in keeping with the findings of the Angiosperm Phylogeny Group.

References

External links

purpurea
Flora of Western Canada
Plants described in 1753
Taxa named by Carl Linnaeus
Flora of Eastern Canada
Flora of the Northeastern United States
Flora of the Southeastern United States
Flora of the North-Central United States
Flora of the South-Central United States
Flora without expected TNC conservation status